Will Anderson Jr. (born September 2, 2001) is an American football outside linebacker for the Alabama Crimson Tide. He won several awards during his time with Alabama, including the Bronko Nagurski Trophy twice, and was a part of Alabama's national championship in 2020.

Early life and high school career
Anderson was born on September 2, 2001, in Hampton, Georgia. He attended Dutchtown High School, where he recorded 22 sacks with 15 tackles for loss as a senior in 2019. Anderson was named to The Atlanta Journal-Constitution "Super 11" team and played in the 2020 All-American Bowl. Anderson committed to play college football at Alabama.

College career
Anderson was named a starter at outside linebacker as a freshman in 2020. He was named second-team All-SEC after finishing with 7 quarterback sacks and 10.5 tackles for loss as the Crimson Tide won the 2021 College Football Playoff National Championship. As a sophomore in 2021, Anderson won the Bronko Nagurski Trophy, was named the SEC Defensive Player of the Year, and was voted a unanimous All-American after recording 17.5 sacks and 34.5 tackles for loss, both of which led the nation.

References

External links
 
 Alabama Crimson Tide bio

Living people
2001 births
African-American players of American football
Alabama Crimson Tide football players
All-American college football players
American football outside linebackers
People from Hampton, Georgia
Players of American football from Georgia (U.S. state)
Sportspeople from the Atlanta metropolitan area
21st-century African-American sportspeople